Charlene may refer to:

People and fictional characters
 Charlene (given name), including a list of people and fictional characters with the given name Charlene or Charleen
 Charlene (singer), American singer Charlene D'Angelo (born 1950)

Music

Albums
 Charlene (Charlene album), 1977
 Charlene (Tweet album), 2016

Songs
 "Charlene" (song), a 2003 song by Anthony Hamilton
 "Charlene", a 1959 song by Jerry Fuller
 "Charlene", a 1995 song by Björk, B-side of "Isobel"
 "Charlene (I'm Right Behind You)", a song by Stephen and the Colberts

See also

 
 Charley (disambiguation)
 Charlie (disambiguation)
 Charlin (disambiguation)
 Charles (disambiguation)
 Charlot (disambiguation)
 Charlotte (disambiguation)
 Carlin (disambiguation)
 Karlin (disambiguation)

cy:Charlene